Sir Arthur Richard Jelf (10 September 1837 in Pankow, near Berlin – 24 July 1917 in Putney) was an English judge.

He was the son of the Rev. Richard William Jelf, principal of King's College, London, by his wife Countess Emmy Schlippenbach, at one time maid of honour to the queen of Hanover. He was educated at Eton College and Christ Church, Oxford, where he took his degree in 1860. He was called to the bar at the Inner Temple in April 1863, became a Q.C. in 1880, and was elected a Bencher of his Inn in 1883. From 1879 to 1901 he was recorder of Shrewsbury, and in November 1901 was raised to the bench as a justice of the High Court of Justice and knighted.

He retired in 1910 and died in 1917.

Notes

References

1837 births
1917 deaths
Queen's Bench Division judges
19th-century King's Counsel
People educated at Eton College
Alumni of Christ Church, Oxford